Francisco Bueno Netto (9 April 1894 – 18 June 1959), known as Chico Netto, was a Brazilian football player who played for Amparo, América, Americano-SP, São Bento and Fluminense.

Netto also briefly managed the Brazilian national side in 1917, making three appearances (scoring one goal) during that time. He later managed the national side again in 1923.

References

External links
 
 

1894 births
1959 deaths
Brazilian footballers
Brazil international footballers
America Football Club (RJ) players
Esporte Clube São Bento players
Fluminense FC players
Brazilian football managers
Brazil national football team managers
Association football defenders
People from Mogi Mirim